Csaba Horváth (born 2 May 1982) is a former Slovak football central defender who last played for the Slovak 2. Liga side Fluminense Šamorín.

Career
He scored in his debut match for ADO Den Haag against Sparta Rotterdam.

On 12 August 2009, Horváth made his international debut in friendly against Iceland (1:1, Reykjavík).

On 4 July 2010 he moved to Polish club Zagłębie Lubin.

References

External links
 Player profile at vi.nl 
 

1982 births
Living people
Sportspeople from Dunajská Streda
Hungarians in Slovakia
Slovak footballers
Slovak expatriate footballers
Slovakia international footballers
Association football central defenders
FK ŠKP Inter Dúbravka Bratislava players
2. Liga (Slovakia) players
AS Trenčín players
Slovak Super Liga players
1. FC Slovácko players
Czech First League players
ADO Den Haag players
Eredivisie players
Zagłębie Lubin players
Piast Gliwice players
Ekstraklasa players
FC ŠTK 1914 Šamorín players
Expatriate footballers in the Czech Republic
Expatriate footballers in the Netherlands
Expatriate footballers in Poland
Slovak expatriate sportspeople in the Czech Republic
Slovak expatriate sportspeople in the Netherlands
Slovak expatriate sportspeople in Poland